George Washington Fleeger (March 13, 1839 – June 25, 1904) was a Republican member of the U.S. House of Representatives from Pennsylvania.

Biography
George W. Fleeger was born in Concord Township, Pennsylvania.  He attended the common schools and West Sunbury Academy.

He was enlisted in the Union Army on June 10, 1861, as a private in Company C, 11th Pennsylvania Reserve Regiment, and was commissioned a first lieutenant in June 1862.  He was brevetted captain, and served until March 13, 1865.

He studied law, was admitted to the bar in 1866 and commenced practice in Butler.  Fleeger served as a member of the Pennsylvania State House of Representatives in 1871 and 1872.  He was the chairman of the Republican State central committee, and a delegate to the Republican State conventions in 1882 and 1890.

Fleeger was elected as a Republican to the Forty-ninth Congress.  He resumed the practice of law in Butler, Pennsylvania, and died there in 1904.  Interment in the North Cemetery.

References
 Retrieved on 2008-02-14
The Political Graveyard

Republican Party members of the Pennsylvania House of Representatives
Union Army officers
Pennsylvania lawyers
Pennsylvania Reserves
1839 births
1904 deaths
Republican Party members of the United States House of Representatives from Pennsylvania
19th-century American politicians